Graham Thurgood is a retired professor of linguistics at California State University, Chico.

Thurgood graduated with a Ph.D. in linguistics from University of California, Berkeley, where he studied under James Matisoff.

Thurgood's areas of specialization include tonogenesis, historical linguistics, language contact, and second language acquisition. Thurgood has reconstructed Chamic (Austronesian), the Hlai languages (Kra-Dai and Kam-Sui), and parts of Tibeto-Burman (Sino-Tibetan).

Thurgood's tone work includes the reconstruction of tone in Chamic, internal reconstruction of tone in Jiamao, and a substantial article on tonogenesis in general.

Publications
 
 Graham Thurgood. (1999). From Ancient Cham to Modern Dialects: Two Thousand Years of Language Contact and Change: With an Appendix of Chamic Reconstructions and Loanwords. Oceanic Linguistics Special Publications, No. 28, pp. i, iii-vii, ix-xiii, xv-xvii, 1-259, 261-275, 277-397, 399-407.
 Graham Thurgood. (1992). The aberrancy of the Jiamao dialect of Hlai: speculation on its origins and history. Southeast Asian Linguistics Society I, Edited by Martha Ratliff and Eric Schiller. Tempe: Arizona State University Southeast Asian Studies Publication Program. pp. 417–433.

References

Official faculty page

Linguists from the United States
Historical linguists
Linguists of Southeast Asian languages
Year of birth missing (living people)
Living people
California State University, Chico faculty
Linguists of Kra–Dai languages
University of California, Berkeley alumni
Fellows of the Linguistic Society of America